Women's Slalom World Cup 1982/1983

Calendar

Final point standings

In Women's Slalom World Cup 1982/83 the best 5 results count.

References
 fis-ski.com

World Cup
FIS Alpine Ski World Cup slalom women's discipline titles